1,1,1,2-Tetrachloroethane is a chlorinated hydrocarbon.  It is a colorless liquid with a sweet chloroform-like odor.  It is used as a solvent and in the production of wood stains and varnishes.

See also
 1,1,2,2-Tetrachloroethane

References

Chloroalkanes
Halogenated solvents
IARC Group 2B carcinogens
Sweet-smelling chemicals